This is a list of diplomatic missions of Switzerland, excluding honorary consulates. Switzerland is well known as a protecting power, having used its embassies abroad to represent the interests of states hostile to each other since the Franco-Prussian War.  In the Second World War Switzerland served as protecting power for 35 countries on both sides—its embassy in Washington represented Germany, Italy, Japan, and Vichy France. In many post-war conflicts, including in the Democratic Republic of Congo, South Asia, the Middle East, and Serbia, Switzerland has provided a continuity of representation after formal relations were severed between belligerents, facilitating the delivery of humanitarian aid and conflict resolution.

Since 1919, Switzerland has also represented the Principality of Liechtenstein in those countries wherein Liechtenstein itself does not maintain consular representation. Owing to its size and population, Liechtenstein maintains a very small network of diplomatic missions.

Current missions

Africa

Americas

Asia

Europe

Oceania

Multilateral organizations

Gallery

Closed missions

Africa

Americas

Asia

Europe

See also
 Foreign relations of Switzerland
 List of diplomatic missions in Switzerland
 Protecting power

Notes

References

External links

 Federal Department of Foreign Affairs of Switzerland

 
Switzerland
Diplomatic missions